The New England Music Awards are an annual award show.  Bands and artists from the New England region of the United States are eligible for receipt of the awards.

Nomination process
Recipients are selected through their recordings, appearances and reputation. The awards were created by music promoter Joe Graham and Sugarpop Records label executive Dennis Hennessey in 2011, and the first ceremony occurred in 2012. The nominating committee consists of music journalists, radio personalities, record label executives and talent scouts. Event coordinator Mike Flynn says "when you take New England as a whole and look at all the amazing music and talent that's out there, it's mind blowing," adding "putting that talent together under one roof also helps some artists get recognition that they might not have had before."

History

2012 awards

The inaugural 2012 New England Music Awards were held at Boston Hard Rock Cafe, on March 9, 2012.
Band of the Year – Grace Potter and the Nocturnals
Album of the Year – Ragtop Angel by the Adam Ezra Group
Song of the Year – "Takin Off" by the Adam Ezra Group
Producer of the Year – Aaron Johnson
Songwriter of the Year – Martin Sexton
New Act of the Year – Suicide Dolls
Female Performer of the Year – Liz Longley
Male Performer of the Year – Chris Trapper

2013 awards

The 2013 New England Music Awards were held at Lowell Memorial Auditorium. The event was moved to accommodate all ages and an anticipated larger crowd.
Band of the Year – The Adam Ezra Group
Album of the Year – NORDO by Air Traffic Controller
Song of the Year – "Yeah Man" by Ryan Montbleau
Producer of the Year – Sean McLaughlin
Songwriter of the Year – Matt Nathanson
New Act of the Year – Sarah Borello
Female Performer of the Year – Sarah Blacker
Male Performer of the Year – Chris Trapper

2014 awards
The 2014 New England Music Awards were held at Lowell Memorial Auditorium, on February 22, 2014. The ceremony began at 7 P.M., and coincided with the Lowell Winterfest. It was hosted by comedian Steve Sweeney, with performances by Nemes, the Mallett Brothers, Hayley Sabella, Dressed for the Occasion and Sarah Borrello.

Band of the Year – The Mallett Brothers Band
Album of the Year – Land by the Mallett Brothers Band
Song of the Year – "The Dreams in the Ditch" by Deer Tick
Producer of the Year – Nick Tirrell
Songwriter of the Year – Chris Ross
New Act of the Year – Sarah Barrios
Female Performer of the Year – Lori McKenna
Male Performer of the Year – Josh Logan

2015 awards
The 2015 New England Music Awards were held at Showcase Live, on April 18, 2015. Boston Comedy Festival winner David Russo hosted the event, and the live performers were We Were Astronauts, Amy & the Engine, Pat & the Hats, the Willie J. Laws Band, Ben Knight and Sarah Barrios.
Band of the Year – The Shana Stack Band
Album of the Year – National Throat by Will Dailey
Song of the Year – "Sunken Ship" by Will Dailey
Producer of the Year – Brian Coombes
Songwriter of the Year – Ellison Jackson
New Act of the Year – West End Blend
Female Performer of the Year – Anna Lombard
Male Performer of the Year – Dan Blakeslee

2016 awards
The 2016 New England Music Awards were held at Blue Ocean Music Hall. The ceremony began at 7:30 P.M.
Band of the Year – Dwight & Nicole
Album of the Year – Fall Your Way by Frank Viele
Song of the Year – "Let Your Hair Down" by Adam Ezra Group
Producer of the Year – Vic Steffens
Songwriter of the Year – Daphne Lee Martin
New Act of the Year – Hunter
Female Performer of the Year – Ruby Rose Fox
Male Performer of the Year – Frank Viele

2017 awards
The 2017 New England Music Awards were held at Showcase Live, on April 29, 2017. Bands that performed were Cold Engines, Sygnal to Path and the Balkun Brothers, and the event closed with a tribute to Prince by the band Love Sexy.

Band of the Year – Roots of Creation
Album of the Year – Domestic by Ruby Rose Fox
Song of the Year – "The Mystic" by Adam Jensen
Producer of the Year – Jonathan Wyman
Songwriter of the Year – Julia Russo
New Act of the Year – Gracie Day
Female Performer of the Year – Annie Brobst
Male Performer of the Year – Jay Psaros

2018 awards
The 2018 New England Music Awards were held at Mixx 360, on September 8, 2018.
Band of the Year – Ruby Rose Fox
Album of the Year – Salt by Ruby Rose Fox
Song of the Year – "Change of Heart" by Annie Brobst
Producer of the Year – Sean McLaughlin
Live Act of the Year – Flight of Fire
New Act of the Year – Lyssa Coulter
Songwriter of the Year – Frank Viele
Male Performer of the Year – Munk Duane
Female Performer of the Year – Christa Gniadek
Rock Act of the Year – Analog Heart
Pop Act of the Year – Ripe
Hip Hop Act of the Year – Jazzmyn RED
Country Act of the Year – Scarlett Drive
Roots Act of the Year – Soggy Po Boys
Hard Rock / Metal Act of the Year – FirstBourne
Blues Act of the Year – Julie Rhodes
Jazz Act of the Year – Gretchen & The Pickpockets
Soul / R&B Act of the Year – Aubrey Haddard
Best in State Massachusetts – Savasha
Best in State New Hampshire – Katie Dobbins
Best in State Vermont – Gang of Thieves
Best in State Rhode Island – The Furies
Best in State Maine – Emily and Jake
Best in State Connecticut – Gracie Day
Video of the Year – "After Party" by Air Traffic Controller, written and directed by Michael Parks Randa
Video of the Year – "Freedom Fighter" by Ruby Rose Fox, directed by Ben Phillippo

2019 awards
Band of the Year – Flight of Fire 
Album of the Year – You Oughta Know by Natalie Joly 
Song of the Year – "Sunken Ship" by Will Dailey
Producer of the Year – Sean McLaughlin
Songwriter of the Year – Amanda McCarthy 
New Act of the Year – Exit 18 
Female Performer of the Year – Danielle Miraglia & the Glory Junkies 
Male Performer of the Year – Joe Sambo
Hard Rock/Metal act of the year - Sepsiss

2021 awards
Album of the Year – Meet Me in the Middle by Erin Harpe, featuring Jim Countryman

Hard Rock/Metal act of the year - Sepsiss

Songwriter of the Year - Sarah King
 
Punk/Hardcore act of the Year - Mallcops

References

Citations

Bibliography

External links

American music awards
Music of New England